The 2012 KHL Junior Draft was the fourth entry draft held by the Kontinental Hockey League (KHL), taking place on 25–26 May 2012 in Traktor Sport Palace. Ice hockey players from around the world aged between 17 and 21 years of age were selected. Players eligible to take part in the draft were required to not have an active contract with a KHL, MHL or VHL team. A total of 998 players participated in the draft, 778 of these playing in Russia, 110 in Europe and 110 in North America.

Denis Alexandrov, a defenceman from MHC Krylya Sovetov, was the first overall selection, chosen by SKA Saint Petersburg.

Selections by round

Round 1

Round 2

Round 3

Round 4

Round 5

See also
2012–13 KHL season
2012 NHL Entry Draft
KHL territorial pick

References

External links
 All 2012 KHL Junior Draft picks

Kontinental Hockey League Junior Draft
Junior Draft